The Alum Bluff Group is a geologic group in the states of Georgia, Florida, and Alabama. It preserves fossils dating back to the Neogene period.

Age
Period: Paleogene to Neogene
Epoch: Late Oligocene to Early Miocene
Faunal stage: Chattian through Hemphillian ~23.03–5.33 mya, calculates to a period of

Location
The Alum Bluff Group replaces the Hawthorn Group west of the Apalachicola River with occurrences in Bay, Calhoun, Holmes, Jackson, Liberty, Okaloosa, Walton, and Washington counties. It is younger than the Torreya Formation to the east based on superpositioning.

The Alum Bluff Group outcrops beneath a thin overburden in the western panhandle from river valleys in Okloosa County eastward to western Jackson County.

Lithology
The group is composed of clays, sands and shell beds. These vary from fossil bearing sandy clays to sands, clays, and carbonate beds absent of fossil content with glauconite and phosphate mica which is common. The coloration is from cream to olive gray with mottled reddish brown in the weathered sections. The sands are soft and very fine to coarse with sporadic gravel while carbonate lenses are quite hard. Permeability of the sediments are generally low and are part of the intermediate confining unit/aquifer system.

Subdivision 
The Alum Bluff Group are defined by the stratigraphic position and mollusks contained within. The group includes:
 Chipola Formation
 Oak Grove Sand
 Shoal River Formation
 Choctawhatchee Formation
 Jackson Bluff Formation

The Alum Bluff Group has a residuum on Miocene sediments and undifferentiated sediment of the Miocene. This consists of reddish brown, variably sandy clay with inclusions of variably fossiliferous, silicified limestone. The residuum includes Lower to Upper Miocene and younger weathered sediments.

Fossils
Mollusks both herbivorous and carnivorous in equal percentages.
Filter feeders at ~7%

See also

 List of fossiliferous stratigraphic units in Georgia (U.S. state)
 Paleontology in Georgia (U.S. state)

References

 
Finch, J., Geological essay on the Tertiary formation in America: American Journal of Science, v. 7, p. 31–43, 1823.

Further reading
Berkenkotter, Richard D,  Application of statistical analysis in evaluating bedded deposits of variable thickness—Florida phosphate data (United States. Bureau of Mines. Report of investigations, U.S. Dept. of the Interior, Bureau of Mines (1964)
 Gardner J.A. (1937). The molluscan fauna of the Alum Bluff Group of Florida. Part VI. Pteropoda, Opisthobranchia and Ctenobranchia (in part). United States Geological Survey Professional Paper. 142-F: 251–435, pls 37–48

Geologic groups of Georgia (U.S. state)